Nick Loren (born December 14, 1970) is an American actor, Emmy nominated television host, singer-songwriter, producer, and professional stunt double. He has been the professional stunt double for John Travolta and an accredited actor in over 24 films including From Paris with Love, Old Dogs, Wild Hogs, Hairspray, A Love Song for Bobby Long, Be Cool, Swordfish, and Face/Off. Loren has been featured on Entertainment Tonight, The Insider, The Hollywood Reporter, AdAge.com, O Magazine, Dateline NBC, Eye on LA, as well as many morning shows and magazines.

Career 
In February 1996 Loren met actor John Travolta while working as a stand-in on the set of Face/Off. Loren put his music on hold to work with Travolta. In 1997, Loren had a small role in the movie The General's Daughter. In late 2007 Loren decided to go back to music, launching his debut solo album titled Forever Be Cool in June 2008. The release party was hosted by television personality Mark Steines of Entertainment Tonight and attended by Travolta, Nikki Blonsky, Luis Guzmán, Chubby Checker, and director Tony Scott. His album reached number 6 on the Top 40 AC chart in January 2009.

While filming From Paris with Love in Paris, France in December 2008, Loren suffered a severe broken ankle after a stunt went wrong and he fell three stories out of a window.  This led Loren to evaluate his profession as a stuntman and he redirected his career towards hosting and producing film and television.  One of Loren's first producing endeavors was Dog-On Television, a DVD for stay at home dogs.  The DVD has been featured in O Magazine, on Dateline NBC's Pet Nation, Entertainment Tonight and The Insider. Along with producing, Loren has gone on to become a television personality for the magazine style talk show First Coast Living.  Nick was nominated for a Suncoast Emmy for his hosting on First Coast Living in 2011.

Loren has traveled the country teaching workshops to children and young adults on how to handle being in the entertainment business. Loren was a single dad to his 5-year-old son before he married television and film line producer/UPM, Denise Loren September 9, 2000. They now have two children together.

Filmography

Discography

Albums 
Forever Be Cool (2008)

References 

IN a valley of Violence as John Travolta's stunt double, 2016

External links 
http://www.imdb.me/nickloren/
http://www.firstcoastliving.net/

Living people
Television personalities from California
Musicians from San Diego
Singers from California
Male actors from San Diego
1970 births
21st-century American singers
21st-century American male singers